Duarte da Silva Marques (born December 3, 1983 in Rio Maior) is a triathlete from Portugal. He competed at the 2008 Summer Olympics in Beijing, where he placed forty-fifth in the men's triathlon, with a time of 1:55:06.

At the peak of his career, Marques has achieved 14 top ten finishes in over fifty competitions, including his championship triumph at the 2007 ITU European Cup in Split, Croatia.

References

External links
ITU Profile

1983 births
Portuguese male triathletes
Living people
Olympic triathletes of Portugal
Triathletes at the 2008 Summer Olympics
People from Rio Maior
Sportspeople from Santarém District